Chen Tain-jy is a Taiwanese politician. He was the Minister of National Development Council in 2016–2017.

Academic career
Chen obtained his bachelor's degree in electrical engineering from National Taiwan University in 1975 and doctoral degree in economics from Pennsylvania State University in the United States in 1983. He then returned to Taiwan to teach at NTU.

Political career
He led the Council for Economic Planning and Development from 2008 to 2009, during the Ma Ying-jeou administration, and returned to government work in 2016 to serve as minister of the National Development Council.

References

1953 births
Living people
Academic staff of the National Taiwan University
National Taiwan University alumni
Pennsylvania State University alumni
Politicians of the Republic of China on Taiwan from New Taipei